Akhtam Mustafoevich Nazarov (born 29 September 1992) is a Tajik professional footballer who plays as a defender for Andijon and the Tajikistan national football team.

Career

Club
In November 2019, Nazarov signed for Bangladesh Champions Bashundhara Kings on a one-year contract.

On 22 July 2020, Nazarov returned to FC Istiklol, signing a contract until the end of the 2021 season.

On 30 January 2023, Istiklol announced that Nazarov was leaving the club to sign for Andijon on a two-year contract.

Career statistics

Club

International

International goals
As of match played 9 October 2018. Tajikistan score listed first, score column indicates score after each Nazarov goal.

Honours
Istiklol
Tajik League: 2014, 2015, 2016, 2017, 2018 2019, 2020, 2021, 2022
Tajik Cup: 2013, 2014, 2016, 2018
Tajik Supercup: 2014, 2018, 2018, 2019, 2021, 2022

Tajikistan
King's Cup: 2022

References

1988 births
Living people
Tajikistani footballers
Tajikistan international footballers
Tajikistan Higher League players
FC Istiklol players
Footballers at the 2014 Asian Games
Association football defenders
Asian Games competitors for Tajikistan